Hanne Behrens (born 1950) is a Danish goldsmith and master of textile techniques who specializes in weaving precious metals. Her work is known for its intricate weaving paired with clean lines and shapes. Her work has won numerous international awards. She studied under Arline Fisch and Mary Lee Hu, both metal textile artists, but Behrens has developed her own techniques and distinct visual style. She works primarily in high karat golds and silver. She frequently incorporates found objects such as shells into her weavings.

Education 
Teachers: Arline Fisch and Mary Lee Hu

 1968-72  Apprenticed as goldsmith in Tønder, Denmark.
 1973  Studied at Fachhochschule, Schwäbisch-Gmünd, Germany.
 1975–77  Goldsmith's High School, Copenhagen, Denmark.
 1978  Studied at San Diego State University, Art (Prof. Arline M. Fisch) California, United States.
 1997  Studied at University of Washington, Art (Prof. Mary Lee Hu), Washington, United States.

Awards 

 1977  Handelsbanken's Travel grant.
 1979  Bronze Medal, Danish Craftsman-designer Prize of 1879.
 1980  Silver Medal, Danish Craft-designer Prize of 1879.
 1982  The design competition of the goldsmith profession: Two medals.
 1986  The States Fund for the endowment of fine arts, working scholarship.
 1988  K. A. Larsen og Hustrus Grant.
 1988  Højskolernes Håndarbejde Fund.
 1992  Denmark's Nationalbank's Jubilæumsfond of 1968.
 1992  Thrige's Fund.
 1992  The States Fund for the endowment of fine arts, working scholarship.
 1996  The States Fund for endowment of fine arts, Travel grants.
 1996  Design Fund, Travel grants.
 1996  Dalhoff Larsen's Fund, Travel grants.
 1998  The States Fund for endowment of fine arts, working scholarship.
 1998  Gold Medal, VIII Biennale Internazionale del Merletto, Sansepolcro, Italy.
 1999  Denmark's Nationalbanks Jubilæumsfond of 1968, Travel grants.
 1999  Place 9 in Internationaler Bernstein - Kunsthandwerkerpreis der Ostsee, Ribnitz-Damgarten, Tyskland. 
 2000  Commissioned to make a brooch as a gift to Margrethe II of Denmark on her 60th birthday
 2001  Dalhoff Larsen's Fund, Travel grants.
 2003  Denmark's Nationalbanks Jubilæumsfond of 1968, Travel grants.
 2004  The States Fund for the endowment of fine art, Travel grants (Santa Fe Symposium NM, Solo show at Mobilia Gallery, Cambridge MA and SOFA New York), United States.

Exhibitions 

Curated exhibitions:

 1978   "The Silver Guild" New York City, NY, United States.
 1983   Kunstnernes sommerudstilling, Tistrup.
 1984, 1986  Charlottenborgs Forårsudstilling, Copenhagen.
 1994   "VI Biennale Internazionale del Merletto", Sansepolcro, Italy.
 1995   "Biennalen" Kunstindustrimuseet, Copenhagen, Denmark.
 1996   "VII Biennale Internazionale del Merletto", Sansepolcro, Italy.
 1998   "VIII Biennale Internazionale del Merletto", Sansepolcro, Italy (Gold medal).
 2000   "Euro-Fire in the Land of Liège" Liège, Belgium.
 2000   "IX Biennale International del Merletto" Sansepolcro, Italy.
 2001   "Jewellery" International Craft Exhibition, Itami, Japan and Osaka Municipal Craft Park, Osaka, Japan.
 2002   X Biennale Internazionale Del Merletto, Sansepolcro, Italy.
 2002   Jewelry from painting Mobilia, Cambridge MA, United States.

Solo exhibitions:

 1992  Tønder Museum, Tønder, Denmark.
 1992  Galleri 2 RN, Åkirkeby, Denmark.
 1993  Gallerie Art So-To, Aalborg, Denmark.
 1999  Dowse Artmuseum, Upper Hutt, Wellington, New Zealand.
 2000  Galleri 2 RN, Åkirkeby, Denmark.
 2003  Aalborg Kunstpavillon, Aalborg, Denmark.
 2004  Mobilia Gallery, Cambridge, MA, United States.
 2005  "Spitzen Stücke", Museum für Kunst und Kulturgeschichte, Dortmund, Germany.
 2007  Metal / Tekstilt – Hanne Behrens – 30 years' play with wire. Museum Søndejylland, Tønder, Denmark.
 2008  Mobilia Gallery, Cambridge, MA, United States.
 2010  Galerie Beeld & Aambeeld, Enschede, Netherlands.
 2010  Galleri New Form, Trelleborg, Sweden.
 2010  Mobilia Gallery, Cambridge, MA, United States.

Group exhibitions:

 1995   "School of Fisch", Nordjyllands Kunstmuseum, Aalborg, Denmark / DesignYard, Dublin, Ireland / Craft and Folk Art Museum, Los Angeles, United States.
 1995  "Forms in Progression" The Danish Institute in Athens, Greece.
 1996  "Textile Techniques in Metal" Mobilia Gallery, Cambridge, MA, United States.
 1996  "Hollyday with Arline Fisch" Gallery Eight, La Jolla, CA, United States.
 1996  "Den Danske Broche" Marienlyst Slot, Helsingør, Denmark.
 1996  "Eksperimenter i smykker" Center for Dansk Kunsthåndværk, Herning, Denmark.
 1996  "Kunsthandwerk aus Schleswig-Holstein und Dänemark" Schleswig-Holsteins
 Repræsentation in Bonn, Germany.
 1997   "The Teapot Redefined" Mobilia Gallery, Cambridge, United States.
 1998   "Forms in Progression" Skovgaard Museet, Viborg, Denmark.
 1998  "Souvenir - Out of Denmark" DesignYard, Dublin, Ireland.
 1998  "Artifacts and Archetypes" Mobilaia Gallery, Cambridge, MA, United States.
 1998  "Kunsthandwerk aus Schleswig-Holstein und Dänemark" Wenzel-Halblik-Museum, Itzehoe, Germany..
 1999  "Vrå-Udstillingen 99" guest, Vrå, Denmark.
 1999  "Kunsthandwerk aus Schleswig-Holstein und Dänemark". Dithmarscher Landesmuseum, Meldorf, Germany.
 2000  "Amber, finery and use" Ravmuseet, Oksbøl, Denmark.
 2000  "Kunsthandwerk aus Schleswig-Holstein und Dänemark" Ostholstein-Museum, Eutin, Germany.
 2001  "The Ring" Mobilia Gallery, Cambridge, MA, United States.
 2001  "Braid" Nordjyllands Kunstmuseum, Aalborg and Tønder Museum, Denmark.
 2002  SOFA, Chicago, United States.
 2002  SOFA, New York, United States.
 2002  "Textile Techniques in Metal" Mobilia Gallery, Cambridge, MA, United States.
 2003  "The Ring" Ruthin Gallery, Ruthin, Wales, United Kingdom.
 2003  SOFA New York, United States.
 2003  "Earrings" Mobilia Gallery, Cambridge, MA, United States..
 2003  "Smykker i lys" Århus Kunstbygning, Århus, Denmark.
 2003  SOFA, Chicago, United States.
 2004  SOFA, New York and Chicago, United States..
 2004  "Blue" Mobilia Gallery, Cambridge, MA, United States.
 2005  SOFA, New York and Chicago, Mobilia Gallery, United States.
 2005  "Amber, finery and use", Ravmuseet Oksbøl.
 2005  "Necklace", Mobilia Gallery, Cambridge, MA, United States.
 2006  SOFA, New York and Chicago, Mobilia Gallery, United States.
 2007  SOFA, New York, Mobilia Gallery, United States.
 2007  “Vrå-udstillingen 07” Vrå, Denmark.
 2007  “Form, farve og fællesskab” Dronninglund Kunstcenter, Denmark.
 2007  ”Design Collection Winther 2007” Roger Bilcliffe Gallery, Glasgow, Scotland.
 2008  SOFA, New York, Mobilia Gallery, United States.
 2008  YUFUKU Gallery, Tokyo, Japan.
 2008  "Remember-ring" Galerie Beeld & Aambeeld, Enschede, Holland.
 2009  SOFA, New York, Mobilia Gallery, United States.
 2009  "Remember-ring" National Craft Gallery, Kilkenny, Ireland.
 Galerie Cebra, Düsseldorf, Germany.
 "Smycke-atelje", Lindköbing, Sweden.
 Gallery Expo-Arte, Norway.
 2009  "Vraa-udstillingen", Kunstbygningen, Vraa, Denmark.
 2009 "Textile Arts 2009" Mobilia Gallery, Cambridge, MA, United States.
 2010  "Vraa-udstillingen", Kunstbygningen, Vraa, Denmark.
 2010  East meet West, Yufuku Gallery, Tokyo, Japan.
 2010  Du textile au bijou, Pôle Bijou galerie, Baccart, France.
 2011  Biennalen for Kunsthåndværk og Design 2011, Museet på Koldinghus
 2011  Rav-museet i Kaliningrad, Russland, Norway.
 2011  Knipling udstilling, Putin Museet, Moskva, Russland, Norway.
 2011  "Vraa-udstillingen", Kunstbygningen, Vraa, Denmark.

Collections 

 1985 The States Fund for endowment of fine arts, Denmark.
 1988  The Art Fund of 14 August, Copenhagen, Denmark.
 1989  Vendsyssel Art Museum, Hjoerring, Denmark.
 1992  The States Fund for endowment of fine arts, Denmark.
 1992  The Art Fund of 14. August, Copenhagen, Denmark.
 1993  The Art Fund of 14. August, Copenhagen, Denmark.
 1996  Schleswig-Holsteins Landesmuseum, Gottorf Castel, Germany.
 1998  The Art Fund of 14. August, Copenhagen, Denmark.
 2000  Ravmuseet i Oksbøl (Ambermuseum), Denmark.
 2003  Koch's Ring Collection, Switzerland.
 2004  The Sparta Teapot Museum, NC, United States.
 2005  Ravmuseet i Oksbøl (Ambermuseum), Denmark.
 2005  Museum Für Kunst und Kulturgeschichte, Dortmund, Germany.
 2007  Museum Soendejylland, Toender, Denmark.
 2008  New Carlsberg Fund, Denmark.

Official works

 2000  Nordjyllands Amts gift to H.M. Queen Margrethe II of Denmark, 60th birthday (lace brooch).
 2000  Løgstør Kommunes gift to H.M. Queen Margrethe II of Denmark, 100 years City birthday (brooch and earclips in gold and amber).

Publications 

 Kraks Blå Bog.
 1996  Textile Techniques in Metal, Arline M. Fisch, .
 2000  Jewelry Design The artisan's Reference, Elizabeth Olver .
 2001  Dansk smykkekunst, Lise Funder, .
 2001  Textile Techniques in Metal. Arline M. Fisch. 
 2006  Crocheted wire jewelry, Arline M. Fisch

References 

Danish goldsmiths
20th-century Danish metalsmiths
21st-century Danish metalsmiths
1950 births
Living people